don Eduardo Crespo y García-Castrillón (? – 29 May 1989 in Madrid) was a Spanish aristocrat, son of don Fernando Isabel Crespo y Martín-Romero and wife doña María del Carmen García-Castrillón y ..., and paternal grandson of don Eduardo Antonio Crespo y Gálvez del Postigo  and wife doña María Martín-Romero y Godoy di Bassano, 5th Countess of Castillo Fiel.

He was 8th Conde de Castillo Fiel with a Coat of Arms of de Tudó (8 November 1963). He married María Luisa Sampere Marzal (member of the rural landowning Marzal family of Olivenza, Province of Badajoz). It is not known if he had children. The title ended upon his death.

Sources

1989 deaths
Eduardo 08
Year of birth unknown